Selling My Soul is the third solo studio album by Wu-Tang Clan member Masta Killa, it was released on December 11, 2012 on Nature Sounds Records and Royal Lion Music. Production was handled by 9th Wonder, Mathematics, PF Cuttin, as well as guest appearances from Kurupt and Ol' Dirty Bastard.

Background 
When asked about the album's direction, he stated:

Track listing

References

Masta Killa albums
Nature Sounds albums
2012 albums
Albums produced by Mathematics